Dymasia is a monotypic genus of butterflies in the family Nymphalidae. Its single species is the tiny checkerspot (Dymasia dymas), also known as the dyman checkerspot, which is found from the southern United States to Central America.

Subspecies
D. d. dymas – tiny checkerspot (Texas)
D. d. chara (W.H. Edwards, [1884]) – Chara checkerspot (Arizona)
D. d. imperialis (Bauer, 1959) (California)

References

Melitaeini
Monotypic butterfly genera
Taxa named by Robert P. Higgins